Darwin Diengdoh Pugh (12 January 1927 – 17 November 2008) was the second Chief Minister of the state of Meghalaya in north-eastern India and the first Khasi person to hold the position. He was the general secretary of All Party Hill Leaders Conference (APHLC).

Career
Born on 12 January 1927 at Sohra to late Bransly Marpna Pugh and Glis Diengdoh, Pugh had his education at Gauhati University. He began his professional career as a crew in the Navy during the Second World War. He also served as the Headmaster of the Nisangram School in Garo Hills and Cherra Presbyterian Proceeding High School in Nongsawlia, Sohra. Pugh joined active politics in the early 1960s and was elected as member of the Khasi Hills Autonomous District Council in 1967–72. In 1972, he was elected on the APHLC ticket from Nongskhen constituency, bordering Bangladesh and subsequently made his maiden entry to the first state Assembly.

References

Chief Ministers of Meghalaya
Meghalaya politicians
1927 births
2008 deaths
Gauhati University alumni
People from East Khasi Hills district
State cabinet ministers of Meghalaya
Meghalaya MLAs 1978–1983